The women's 100 metres hurdles event at the 1981 Summer Universiade was held at the Stadionul Naţional in Bucharest on 23 and 24 July 1981.

Medalists

Results

Heats

Wind:Heat 1: +0.2 m/s, Heat 2: +0.3 m/s, Heat 3: +0.4 m/s

Final

Wind: -0.6 m/s

References

Athletics at the 1981 Summer Universiade
1981